Xymena Zaniewska-Chwedczuk (b. July 4, 1924, Poznań – desc. February 12, 2016, Warsaw) was a Polish scenographer, architect, fashion designer, and interior designer.

Work 
From 1958–1981 she was the designer of the set design for several hundred performances of the Polish Television Theater at Telewizja Polska (including Macbeth, School of Wives, Visit of an elderly Lady) and television programs. She was an author of stage design for 5 ballet films and created scenography for 35 classical theatrical and 15 opera performances. She also arranged 20 exhibitions at the Poznań International Fair as well as 20 foreign exhibitions.

From 1981, she was preparing fashion shows in Germany. Xymena Zaniewska was one of the characters in the documentary series by Robert Laus under the title "Twentieth Century" (2010), where the profiles of Polish artists were presented.

Personal life 
Her first husband was Ryszard Zaniewski, with whom she had a son, Iwo Zaniewski. She often collaborated with her second husband, Mariusz Chwedczuk, also a scenographer.

Awards 
First prize of the La Société suisse des ingénieurs et des architectes for the pavilion design - 1972.

"A Star of the Polish National Television" - an award for "scenography and personality" - 2002.

Selected works 
Her most notable scenographies include:
 Peter Shaffer's Black Comedy (Warszawski Teatr Dramatyczny; 1969)
 Stanisław Moniuszko's Śpiewnik domowy (Songbook for Home Use) (Teatr Narodowy; 1982)
 Giuseppe Verdi's La traviata (Teatr Wielki, Poznań; 1983)

Decoration of merit
The Commander's Cross (Polish: Krzyż Komandorski) - 07/11/2005

The Commander's Cross with Star (Polish: Krzyż Komandorski z gwiazdą) - 11/11/1996

References

1924 births
2016 deaths
20th-century Polish architects
Polish costume designers
Architects from Poznań
Polish fashion designers
Polish women fashion designers
Polish interior designers
People from Poznań Voivodeship (1921–1939)